Androcalva luteiflora is a species of flowering plant in the family Malvaceae and is endemic to western Australia. It is an erect, sucker-forming shrub with egg-shaped leaves, the edges irregularly toothed, and clusters of 3 to 18 or more yellow flowers.

Description
The edges of the leaves are turned under and irregularly toothed, the lower surface covered with matted, white to pale brown hairs. Flowering occurs from July to October and the fruit is a hairy, spherical capsule  in diameter.

Taxonomy
This species was first formally described in 1904 by Ernst Georg Pritzel who gave it the name Rulingia luteiflora in Botanische Jahrbücher für Systematik, Pflanzengeschichte und Pflanzengeographie. In 2011, Carolyn Wilkins and Barbara Whitlock assigned it to the new genus Androcalva in Australian Systematic Botany. The specific epithet (luteiflora) means "golden-yellow-flowered".

Distribution and habitat
Androcalva luteiflora grows in sandy soil, sometimes in rocky habitats and is widespread in Western Australia, and also occurs near Mount Winter in central Northern Territory.<ref name=FB>{{FloraBase|name=Androcalva luteiflora|id=40910}}</ref>

Conservation statusAndrocalva luteiflora is listed as "not threatened" by the Western Australian Government Department of Biodiversity, Conservation and Attractions, but as "near threatened" under the Northern Territory Government Territory Parks and Wildlife Conservation Act''.

References

luteiflora
Flora of Western Australia
Flora of the Northern Territory
Plants described in 1904
Taxa named by Ernst Pritzel